Valentin Aleksandrovich Avrorin (December 23 1907, Tambov - February 26 1977, Leningrad) was a Corresponding Member of the Academy of Sciences of the USSR and an expert in languages. He was born in Tambov, Russian Empire to a family of teachers. He was outstanding in the sphere of Tungusic languages, and was one of the active creators of the Nanai written language. In 1925 Avrorin graduated from one of the Tambov schools.

Biography
In 1930, graduated from the Faculty of History and Ethnology of the Saint Petersburg State University.

In 1956, defended PhD in Philology.

Professor, Department of General Linguistics, Faculty of Humanities, Novosibirsk State University, the first dean of the faculty.

June 26, 1964 elected a corresponding member of the Academy of Sciences of the Soviet Union.

Links
Avrorin Valentin Alexandrovich (Bibliography)

1907 births
1977 deaths
People from Tambov
People from Tambovsky Uyezd
Tungusologists
Language activists
Linguists from the Soviet Union
Academic staff of Herzen University
Recipients of the Order of the Red Banner of Labour